Grover Cleveland Bergdoll (October 18, 1893 – January 27, 1966) was an early aviator, racing driver and World War I draft dodger, who went to Germany to avoid prison.

Biography
He was born in Philadelphia to a wealthy brewing family. He was one of 119 people to train at the Wright Flying School, and in 1912 he purchased a Wright Model B biplane for $5,000. Bergdoll made several public flights from an airfield on family-owned land outside Philadelphia, and was the first person to fly an airplane between Philadelphia and Atlantic City, New Jersey. After 748 flights the plane was placed in storage; it was later rediscovered and restored, and in 1936 it was donated to the Franklin Institute. 

Bergdoll attempted to qualify for the 1915 Indianapolis 500 and also raced between 1911 and 1916, almost exclusively in his brother Erwin Bergdoll's cars.

Although Bergdoll registered for the draft, he skipped a physical and failed to turn in a questionnaire on his fitness for duty. He was declared a deserter in 1918 (As he never enlisted he was actually guilty of evading Article 58 of the Selective Service Act of 1917), eluded police for two years, and was arrested at his home in January 1920. After he was found guilty of desertion at a court-martial at Fort Jay on Governors Island, he was sentenced to five years in prison.

Five months later, military authorities allowed Grover to be released under guard to recover a cache of gold he claimed to have buried near Hagerstown, Maryland. During a stop at his Philadelphia home, he escaped with his chauffeur. Despite a nationwide manhunt, the duo managed to cross the border into Canada and sail to Germany, ultimately finding refuge in Eberbach at a hotel owned by Bergdoll's uncle. 

In January 1921, U.S. sergeants Franz Zimmer and Carl Naef sought to kidnap Bergdoll and bring him to an area of Germany that was occupied by the Allies, so he could be returned to the United States. Along with four German men, they ambushed Bergdoll at the Eberbach train station. Bergdoll managed to escape by vehicle, and a passenger named Lena Rupp was shot in the right hand when Naef opened fire on the fleeing car. All six would-be kidnappers were tried and sentenced to prison terms, although the sergeants were soon released due to efforts by the American government.

Another kidnapping attempt was made on August 10, 1923, when Corliss Hooven Griffis of the American Graves Registration Service led a group of four other men in an effort to capture the fugitive. Two men waited in Bergdoll's hotel room in Eberbach to try to seize him, but he managed to shoot both of them, killing one and seriously wounding the other.  The four surviving conspirators were seized and sentenced to prison terms. Griffis was widely considered a hero in the United States, and was also released early after a petition effort to free him collected more than 2 million signatures.

Bergdoll later moved to Weinsberg, Germany and married a German woman. On two occasions, he made secret trips back to Philadelphia. He arrived in 1929 on the first trip and returned in 1933. The second time, he traveled to the U.S. in 1935 and returned to Germany in 1938.

Bergdoll publicly surrendered in May 1939. He was nearly returned to Germany after Representative Forest Harness tried to pass legislation barring the reentry of any draft dodgers who had escaped custody and fled to a foreign country. After another court-martial, he was sentenced to serve the remainder of his original term plus three years. He was imprisoned until 1944.

After his release, Bergdoll lived in Virginia. He died in Richmond, on January 27, 1966, in psychiatric care.

Frank C. Williams, the man drafted immediately after Bergdoll by his local draft board, served in World War I as an engineer and survived the conflict. However, the American Legion claimed that the man "drafted in Bergdoll's place" was Russell C. Gross of Philadelphia, the first man drafted after Bergdoll to die in the war. Gross became a private in Company B of the 328th Infantry Regiment, part of the 82nd Division.  He was killed in action on October 24, 1918, during the Meuse-Argonne Offensive, and posthumously cited for bravery by Brigadier General Julian Robert Lindsey.

References

Further reading
 Roberta Dell: The United States against Bergdoll – How the Government Spent Twenty Years and Millions of Dollars to Capture and Punish America's Most Notorious Draft Dodger, A.S. Barnes: South Brunswick and New York, 1977.
 Dirk Langeveld, The Artful Dodger: The 20-Year Pursuit of World War I Draft Dodger Grover Cleveland Bergdoll, CreateSpace, 2018.
 Sebastian Parzer: Der amerikanische Fahnenflüchtling Grover Cleveland Bergdoll – Über seinen Aufenthalt in Eberbach berichtete sogar die „New York Times", in: Der Odenwald 58 (2011), p. 60-68 (in German).
New York Times; January 8, 1920 "Take Draft Evader After 2-Year Chase; Grover Bergdoll, Wealthy Philadelphia German, Defended By Mother with Revolver. House Veritable Arsenal. Bergdoll Said To Have Offered His Services to this country as an Aviator in 1918. Philadelphia, January 7, 1920 Grover Cleveland Bergdoll, wealthy son of a former brewer and charged with being a draft dodger and deserter from the army, was captured after a two-year chase today while hiding in the palatial residence of his mother on the outskirts of this city. Tonight he is a prisoner on Governors Island, New York, awaiting trial by court-martial.
New York Times; May 26, 1939 "Bergdoll Returns, Is Seized By Army; Grover Cleveland Bergdoll Then And Now. Grover Cleveland Bergdoll, America's most notorious wartime draft dodger, arrived in this country yesterday. He was placed under arrest on a charge of desertion by officers of the United States Army. Bergdoll was seized in the lounge room of ..."
New York Times; January 29, 1966 "Grover Cleveland Bergdoll Dies; Notorious Draft Dodger Was 72; Playboy, Who Fled Fort Jay With Story of a Pot of Gold, Found Haven in Germany. Richmond, Virginia, January 28, 1966 Grover Cleveland Bergdoll, the most publicized draft dodger of World War I died of pneumonia yesterday in the Westbrook Psychiatric Hospital here. He was 72 years old."

External links
Grover Cleveland Bergdoll bibliography
Early Aviators: Grover Bergdoll
 The Bergdoll Family Papers, including correspondence, clippings and legal documents, are available for research use at the Historical Society of Pennsylvania.

1893 births
1966 deaths
American racing drivers
Conscription in the United States
Draft evaders
People from Philadelphia
Racing drivers from Pennsylvania
Racing drivers from Philadelphia
Sportspeople from Philadelphia